Mardan Sports Complex  is a multi-purpose stadium in Aksu, Antalya, Turkey.  It is currently used mostly for football matches, and it hosted matches during the 2008 UEFA European Under-17 Football Championship, including the final. The stadium has a seating capacity of 7,428.

References

External links

Venue information

Football venues in Turkey
Antalyaspor
Multi-purpose stadiums in Turkey
Sports venues in Antalya
Süper Lig venues
Sports venues completed in 2008